Bad Liebenwerda station is a railway station in the spa town of Bad Liebenwerda, located in the Elbe-Elster district in Brandenburg, Germany.

References

Railway stations in Brandenburg
Buildings and structures in Elbe-Elster